Nolfophidion is an extinct genus of prehistoric ray-finned fish.

References

Prehistoric ray-finned fish genera
Ophidiiformes